Lake Zirahuén is a small endorheic lake in the municipality of Santa Clara del Cobre in Michoacán, Mexico. It is a deep mountain lake with a sandy bottom that is partially covered with mud.

At times Lake Zirahuén has been part of an open and continuous hydrological system together with Lake Cuitzeo and Lake Pátzcuaro, draining into the Lerma River. Today it is a closed basin like Lakes Cuitzeo and Pátzcuaro, although ecologists consider it a sub-basin of the Lerma-Chapala basin.<ref>"Descripción de la cuenca", Recuperación Ambiental del Lago de Pátzcuaro". Accessed October 18, 2009.  </ref>

The Zirahuén allotica (Allotoca meeki)'', a Goodeid fish, is endemic to Lake Zirahuén.

References

Zirahuen
Zirahuen
Landforms of Michoacán